Matteo Barzini is an Italian filmmaker and producer born in Rome in 1981 and raised in Los Angeles, California.

Biography
His first feature documentary United We Stand, about post 9/11 America and the War in Iraq was selected for the 60th Venice International Film Festival making him one of the youngest filmmakers to attend the festival.

In 2008 he produced and directed his second feature documentary Change, about the Obama McCain United States presidential election in 2008. The documentary was distributed by Cinecittà Luce and in competition for the David di Donatello 2010/11.

In 2013 he co-directed his third feature documentary Medè about the Camorra in Naples. It premiered at Rome Independent Film Festival on April 9, 2012.
 
In 2014 he directed the documentary about the Syrian Civil War: The Quake. The soundtrack was scored by Academy Award winner, composer Ennio Morricone. The film premiered on February 8, 2014 during the Roman premiere of George Clooney's film Monuments Men.

Filmography

Awards and Festivals

Venice International Film Festival (2003) Official Selection United We Stand

New York International Independent Film and Video Festival (2004) Honorable Mention United We Stand

Potenza International Film Festival (2004) Official Selection United We Stand

Rome DocFest (2006) Best Editing Hip Hop Diaries

Rome Independent Film Festival (2010) Official Selection Change

Potenza International Film Festival (2010) Official Selection Change

Rome Independent Film Festival (2013) Official Selection Medè (Mayday)

References

Italian film directors
Living people
1981 births
William Howard Taft Charter High School alumni